Gaecheonjeol is a public holiday in South and North Korea on 3 October. Also known by the English name National Foundation Day, this holiday celebrates the legendary formation of the first Korean state of Gojoseon in 2333 BC. This date has traditionally been regarded as the date for the founding of the Korean people.

Gaecheonjeol is also recognized in North Korea, although not as a public holiday, with an annual ceremony at the Mausoleum of Tangun, the founder of Gojoseon.

Origin 
Gae-cheon ("Opening of Heaven") refers to 3 October 2457 BCE, the date when Hwanung (환웅) descended from heaven to live with mankind.

The harvest ceremony was celebrated in the Korean realms; Yeonggo (영고,迎鼓
) of Buyeo; Mucheon (무천,舞天) of Yemaek; Gyeeum (계음,契飮) of Mahan and Byeonhan; Dongmaeng (동맹,東盟) of Goguryeo; and Palgwanhoe (팔관회,八關會) of Silla.

In 1909, Gaecheonjeol was established as a national holiday. At first, the holiday was observed on the third day of the 10th month on the lunar calendar, but it has been fixed on 3 October of the solar Gregorian calendar since 1949.

History 

On 15 January 1909, when Daejongism reopened its gate with Nachul at the center, it was established as a celebration day and celebrated every year. Events like this contributed to fostering the spirit of the Korean people under the pressure of Japanese colonial rule.

When the Provisional Government of the Republic of Korea was established in 1919, the provisional government established 3 October of the lunar calendar as a national holiday. This is based on the universal perception of history, which saw Dangun as the founder of the Hankyoreh at the time and Gojoseon as the first nation of the Korean people.

Following the establishment of the Republic of Korea after Korea's liberation from Japanese colonial rule, the Dangungiwon (단군기원, 檀君紀元), or dan-gi (단기,檀紀), was enacted as the official calendar of the nation in the "Act on official calendars" on 25 September 1948. On 1 October 1949, the "Act on National Day of celebration" was enacted and the date of the third lunar month was designated as the Gaecheonjeol. Since it was originally a lunar calendar, it had been used as a lunar calendar even after the establishment of the Korean government, but after the deliberation of the "Deliberation Council regarding the change of celebrations of gaecheonjeol from the lunar calendar to the solar calendar," which was appointed by the Culture and Education Ministry in 1949, it changed the lunar calendar into a solar calendar and became a great practice as it was said that the records of 3 October were precious.

On the other hand, Daejongism believes that the original meaning of the word "Gaecheon" is not Dangun's founding day, but the third day of the lunar month of October 2457 BC, when Hwanung opened the sky gate and came down below Sin Dansu, Taebaek Mountain, and began the great work of 'Hongikingan' (弘益人間, translated as "to widely benefit the humans") and 'Yihwasegye' (理化世界,translated as "ruling the word with reason").

National Foundation Day Song 
The song was originally sung by people who were believers of Daejongism. After the National Foundation Day becomes as a national holiday, the lyrics were changed as it is sung nowadays.

The lyrics are as follows.

Section 1

우리가 물이라면 새암이 있고 If we are water, we would have a fountain that we originated from.

우리가 나무라면 뿌리가 있다.  If we are a tree, there must be our roots that we originate from.

이 나라 한아버님은 단군이시니 The great father of this country is dangun(implying their root and fountain is dangun).

이 나라 한아버님은 단군이시니 The great father of this country is dangun.

Section 2

백두산 높은 터에 부자요 부부 In the high place of Mountain Paekdu a father(hwanin) gave mysterious thing to his son(hwanung).

성인의 자취 따라 하늘이 텄다. Following the traces of a saint,the heaven has opened.

이날이 시월 상달에 초사홀이니 Since this is the first three days of October that is a harvest month.

이날이 시월 상달에 초사홀이니 Since this is the first three days of October that is a harvest month.

Section 3

오래다 멀다해도 줄기는 하나 The stem is still one, even though it was a long time ago.

다시 필 단쪽잎에 삼천리 곱다 The sandalwood leaves that will bloom again would be beautiful from 3000 li.

잘 받아 빛내오리다 맹세하노니 I swear i would receive it(the stem or the beauty of dangun) and make you( probs dangun) shine.

잘 받아 빛내오리다 맹세하노니 I swear i would receive it(the stem or the beauty of dangun) and make you( probs dangun) shine.

Summarize
개천절 is a public holiday in South and North Korea on 3 October. Also known by the English name National Foundation Day, this holiday celebrates the legendary formation of the first Korean state of Gojoseon in 2333 BC. This date has traditionally been regarded as the date for the founding of the Korean people. Although not as a public holiday, with an annual ceremony at the Mausoleum of Tangun, the founder of Gojoseon. The word “개천절” has a specific meaning which widely benefits humans and ruling the world with reason. National holidays can be defined as those commemorations that a nation's government has deemed important enough to warrant inclusion in the list of official public holidays. They tend to honor a person or event that has been critical in the development of the nation and its identity. Such people and events usually reflect values and traditions shared by a large portion of the citizenry.

When the Provisional Government of the Republic of Korea was established in 1919, the provisional government established 3 October of the lunar calendar as a national holiday. After the deliberation of the "Deliberation Council regarding the change of celebrations of gaecheonjeol (개천절) from the lunar calendar to the solar calendar," which was appointed by the Culture and Education Ministry in 1949, it changed the lunar calendar into a solar calendar and became a great practice as it was said that the records of 3 October were precious. There is also a song that was originally sung by people who were believers of Daejongism. After National Foundation Day became a national holiday, the lyrics were changed as it is sung nowadays. Also, the holiday is similar to many holidays around the world in that it is celebrated with huge displays of fireworks. In Seoul, it always takes place in Yeouido Han River Park, and crowds of people will gather there to watch the fireworks on that day. Each year of the day, a ceremony to honor Tangun is held at the Chamseongdan altar at the summit of Mt. Manisan. This altar is said to have been built by Tangun and is a legendary place of worship and sacrifice favored by ancient kings during Korean history.

See also

Public holidays in South Korea
Public holidays in North Korea
Gojoseon
Korean mythology
Dan-gun-wang-gum

References

External links
   National foundation day song

National days
Public holidays in South Korea
Remembrance days
Korean culture
October observances
Festivals in North Korea
Folk festivals in South Korea
Autumn events in South Korea
Autumn events in North Korea